Batin is a village in Bosnia and Herzegovina. According to the 1991 census, the village is located in the municipality of Posušje.

From Batin comes the famous politician Ljubo Ćesić Rojs and  Fra Petar Bakula.

Demographics 
According to the 2013 census, its population was 721, all Croats of Bosnia and Herzegovina.

References

Populated places in Posušje